John Buchan, 1st Baron Tweedsmuir  (1875–1940) was a Scottish novelist, historian, biographer and editor. Outside the field of literature he was, at various times, a barrister, a publisher, a lieutenant colonel in the Intelligence Corps, the Director of Information—reporting directly to prime minister David Lloyd George—during the First World War and a Unionist MP who served as Governor General of Canada, the 15th since Canadian Confederation.

Born in Perth, Scotland, Buchan was admitted to the University of Glasgow in 1892 to study classics; during his first year at university he edited the works of Francis Bacon, which were published in 1894. The following year he was awarded a scholarship to Brasenose College, Oxford; shortly after his arrival he also published his first novel, Sir Quixote of the Moors, which he dedicated to Gilbert Murray, his university tutor. By the time he left the university he had published five books, including Scholar-Gipsies, the first work of non-fiction he wrote.

Much of Buchan's non-fiction mirrored his circumstances: his time in South Africa resulted in The African Colony, the First World War led to a series of books about the war in general, and the Scottish and South African forces in particular. He interspersed his non-fiction with further novels, and also wrote ten biographies and four volumes of poetry, as well as numerous articles and stories for magazines and journals. During the war he wrote The Thirty-Nine Steps, the novel which has been adapted for film and television more than any of his other work, (film versions in 1935, 1959 and 1978 and a 2008 television version).

Editor

Buchan was the general editor of the Teaching of History series, published by T. Nelson Publishers between 1928 and 1930. In 1900 he was also a member of the editorial board of The Spectator.

Novels

Non-fiction

Biographies

Poetry collections

Short story collections

Notes and references

Notes

References

Sources

External links

 
 
 
 

Bibliographies by writer
Bibliographies of British writers
Works by John Buchan